Manando is the second studio album by South African rapper and singer Emtee, released by Ambitiouz Entertainment on September 15, 2017 and features guest appearances from fellow Ambitiouz label-mates Sjava and Saudi, as well as Nigerian singer Tiwa Savage. The album was produced by Ruff, Tweezy, Christer, Lunatik, Ron Epidemic and Bizz Boy.

Title 
According to Emtee, the album was named after his late "street brother" and the cover art was designed by Mpho Ngakane.

Track listing

Accolades
At 25th South African Music Awards Manando received a nomination for Male Artist of the year and Best hip hop album category.

|-
|rowspan="2"|2018
|rowspan="2"|<div style="text-align: center;">Manando
|Male Artist of the year
|
|-
|Best hip hop album 
|

Personnel 
Manando credits are adapted from AllMusic.

 Ronald Baloyi - Composer
 Bhekimuzi Baphanga - Composer
 Christa Kobedi - Composer
 Jabulani Makhubo - Composer
Tumelo Thandokuhle Mathebula - Composer
 Anele Mbishe - Composer
 Ndivhuwo Cayenne Mudimeli - Composer
 Mthembeni Ndevu - Composer, Primary Artist
 Mfanafuthi Nkosi - Composer
 Lisa Mbalentle Nojoko - Composer
 Mnqobi Nxumalo - Composer
 Saudi - Featured Artist
 Tiwa Savage - Featured Artist
 Sjava - Featured Artist

Release history

References 

Emtee albums
Ambitiouz Entertainment albums
2017 albums
Albums produced by Tweezy